Bruce Hurley (February 16, 1934 – November 4, 2020), was an American politician in the state of Tennessee. Hurley served in the Tennessee House of Representatives as a Republican from the 9th District from 1971 to 1989.

A native of Hancock County, Tennessee, he was a safety engineer, real estate developer, farmer. and businessman. Hurley served in the United States Army and was an alumnus of East Tennessee State University.

In 2017, Hurley was convicted of three counts of shoplifting in Rogersville, Tennessee.

References

1934 births
2020 deaths
Republican Party members of the Tennessee House of Representatives
East Tennessee State University alumni
People from Hancock County, Tennessee
Military personnel from Tennessee
Businesspeople from Tennessee
Farmers from Tennessee
Tennessee politicians convicted of crimes